Douglas Kelley (born August 9, 1928 in Buffalo, New York, USA) is an American industrial designer. He is known for designing the T-chair and the Elna Lotus sewing machine.

Career

Kelley studied at Pratt Institute in New York City, where he met Ross Littell and William Katavolos. They started work for Laverne Originals, a furniture company, designing furniture, textiles and dinnerware. While at Laverne, they designed the 'T-chair', which won the A.I.D (American Society of Interior Designers) Award in 1952 for the best furniture design in the United States. The chair has three legs of chrome steel, connected by a T-shaped stretcher in black enamelled steel. The  sales brochure for the chair explained: 'We sought furniture that would work within a way of building, which would not complement or compete but in a sense continue the program of lines and planes and function as structural elements of the whole'. The chair is now part of the permanent collections of MOMA, the Art Institute of Chicago, the Metropolitan Museum in New York, the Vitra Design Museum and the Victoria & Albert Museum.

Kelley subsequently joined La Compagnie de l’Esthetique Industrielle (CEI) in Paris as managing director, at the invitation of Raymond Loewy. He spent six years there (1960–1966), and collaborated on the design of the iconic Elna Lotus sewing machine. He then resigned to head the newly established design office of Lippincott and Margulies in London. Shortly thereafter he formed Douglas Kelley Associates, located in Jermyn Street, London.

References 

1928 births
American designers
Possibly living people
Pratt Institute alumni